Alondra Negron (born May 31, 1998) is a Puerto Rican middle-distance runner who specializes in the 3000 meter steeplechase.

NCAA record

External links
 
 New Mexico Lobos Alondra Negrón Biography
 
 Alondra Negron Olympics profile
 Alondra Yairet Negron Texidor the sports profile

References

Living people
1998 births
Puerto Rican female middle-distance runners
Puerto Rican female steeplechase runners
21st-century American women
Athletes (track and field) at the 2014 Summer Youth Olympics